"Always On My Mind " is the debut single by Australian singer and songwriter Rani. Released in June 1997 as the lead single from her debut studio album, The Infinite Blue, the song peaked at number 33 on the ARIA Charts in August 1997.
 
At the ARIA Music Awards of 1997, the song was nominated for two awards: Best Pop Release and Best New Talent.

Track listing

Charts

References

 

1997 debut singles
1997 songs
Songs written by Paul Gray (songwriter)